The Burlina is a breed of cattle from the mountainous areas of the Veneto region of north-east Italy. It is distributed mainly in the provinces of Treviso, Verona and Vicenza. It is a dual-purpose breed, but is raised principally for milk production. It has been suggested that it may be related to the similar Bretonne Pie Noir breed of small pied dairy cattle in Brittany.

History 

The origins of the Burlina are unknown.  It has been suggested that it may be related to the Bretonne Pie Noir, a breed of small pied dairy cattle in Brittany, or that it may have been brought into Italy by Cimbrian migrants.

The Burlina was one of the most numerous breeds present in north-eastern Italy in the early 20th century, numbering tens of thousands of head. Until the 1930s, it was the commonest dairy breed on the Altopiano di Asiago, in the Colli Berici, on Monte Grappa and in the Monti Lessini. Numbers declined significantly during the First World War, under the Fascist regime and during the Second World War, and gradually during the 1950s and 1960s. It was mostly replaced by the Friesian, which was deemed more productive. In 1956 the population in the Veneto was recorded as 11,283. By 2008 it had fallen to about 300.

Characteristics 

The Burlina is small, with a pied black-and-white coat. It is well adapted to grazing on poor or marginal mountain pasture, and is hardy, rugged and resistant to disease.

Use 

The Burlina cow has a milk yield comparable to that of other Italian Alpine breeds, and about half that of a Friesian. It is longer-lived and more fertile, and, because of its smaller size, requires less food; it can exploit poor and fragile mountain pastures.

The milk is similar in proportions of protein and fat to that of the Friesian, but is higher in κ-casein and so more suitable for cheese-making. The milk is traditionally used in the production of the regional Morlacco del Grappa cheese. Both the cheese and the Burlina breed are included in the Ark of Taste of the Slow Food Foundation.

The traditional management system is transhumant – the cattle range freely on high alpine pasture during the summer and are brought down to pass the winter in byres where they are fed mostly on hay, with a minimum of concentrated feed.

References 

Dairy cattle breeds
Cattle breeds originating in Italy
Cattle breeds originating in South Tyrol
Cattle breeds originating in Trentino
Veneto
Cattle breeds